Echo Point is a lookout about  south of Katoomba, New South Wales, Australia. It attracts an estimated 1.5–2 million visitors each year. The lookout offers a view to Three Sisters, Mount Solitary and the rock formation known as the Ruined Castle. A short walk from Echo Point leads to The Giant Stairway which provides access to a number of nature walks through Jamison Valley.

References

Lookouts in Australia
Tourist attractions in the Blue Mountains (New South Wales)